David J. Bell (born November 17, 1969) is an American writer and university professor of English. 
His most recent novel is She's Gone, his first young adult novel and a New York Times bestseller. Bell's next adult novel, Try Not To Breathe, will be published in June of 2023.

Personal 

David Bell was born in Cincinnati, Ohio, where he attended St. Catharine of
Siena grade school and graduated from St. Xavier High School in 1988. Bell earned his B.A. from Indiana University Bloomington,  his M.A. in creative writing from Miami University of Ohio, and his
Ph.D. in American literature and creative writing from the University of Cincinnati, where he was a Taft Fellow. In 1998, he married author Molly McCaffrey, who writes under the name M Hendrix. They live in Bowling Green, Kentucky.

Career

Bell began publishing stories in 2002, and they appeared in numerous
journals including Cemetery Dance, Rain Crow, Black Petals, The Edge, Shadow Regions, Shock Totem, Western Humanities Review, and
Backwards City Review.  He has been nominated for the Pushcart Prize five times. His first two novels—The Condemned (2008) and The Girl in the Woods (2009)—were released in hardcover and trade paperback by
Delirium Books, under the name David Jack Bell.

Bell's next novel, Cemetery Girl (2011), was released by New American Library, an imprint of Penguin Publishing Group in 2011. Publishers Weekly called Cemetery Girl "disquieting and suspenseful"  and Suspense Magazine called it "brilliantly engaging, and a must-read for thriller fans." In 2013, Cemetery Girl was a finalist for the Kentucky Literary Award and won le Prix Polar International de Cognac. The novel also received the most write-in votes when The New York Times  asked readers what book should have won the Pulitzer Prize in fiction.

Since Cemetery Girl, Penguin Random House has published twelve more of Bell's adult suspense novels with their New American Library and Berkley imprints, including Try Not To Breathe, which is forthcoming in July of 2023.

Somebody's Daughter received a Library Journal starred review in 2018, and Kill All Your Darlings was nominated for an Edgar Award in 2022.

In 2021, Bell signed a three-book contract with Sourcebooks, one of the fastest growing publishers in the world, to write young adult novels for the Sourcebooks Fire imprint. Bell's first young adult suspense novel, She’s Gone, was published in November of 2022 and appeared on the New York Times young adult paperback bestseller list in December of 2022.

Bell's novels have been translated into numerous languages and included on The New York Times, USA Today, IndieBound, Amazon, Publishers Weekly, and Parnassus Books bestseller lists, as well as being featured as one of Target's Emerging Authors. He also wrote Rides a Stranger, a novella that was published by Mysterious Press in November 2013.

Bell co-edited two anthologies of short fiction with Molly McCaffrey: Commutability: Stories about the Journey from Here to There (2010) and Stuck in the Middle: Writing That Holds You in Suspense (2016), featuring work by a group of diverse writers including Sarah Domet,  Kelcey Ervick, Ed Gorman, Ariana-Sophia Kartsonis, Thomas F. Monteleone, Faye Moskowitz, Norman Prentiss, James Reiss, and Sandra Scofield with cover art by award-winning painter C. David Jones. Both anthologies were published by Main Street Rag publishing.

In addition to his career as a novelist, Bell's essays have appeared in The Wall Street Journal and Crime Reads. He is also a professor of English
at Western Kentucky University in Bowling Green, Kentucky, where he co-founded the M.F.A. program in creative writing. He previously
taught at Miami University in Ohio and St. Andrews University in Laurinburg,
North Carolina.

Books 

Novels
The Condemned (2008), as David Jack Bell
The Girl in the Woods (2009), as David Jack Bell
Cemetery Girl (2011)
The Hiding Place (2012)
Never Come Back (2013)
The Forgotten Girl (2014)
Somebody I Used to Know (2015)
Since She Went Away (2016)
Bring Her Home (2017)
 Somebody's Daughter (2018)
 Layover (2019)
 The Request (2020)
 Kill All Your Darlings (2021)
 The Finalists (2022)
 She’s Gone (2022)
 Try Not to Breathe (forthcoming June 2023)

Novella
Rides a Stranger (2013)

Anthologies co-edited with Molly McCaffrey:
 Commutability: Stories About the Journey from Here to There (2010), as David Jack Bell
 Stuck in the Middle: Writing That Holds You in Suspense (2016)

References

External links

 David Bell at PenguinRandomHouse
 
 David Jack Bell at LC Authorities with 2 records

1969 births
St. Xavier High School (Ohio) alumni
Living people
American male novelists
21st-century American novelists
21st-century American male writers
Indiana University Bloomington alumni
Miami University alumni
University of Cincinnati alumni
Miami University faculty
St. Andrews University (North Carolina) faculty
Western Kentucky University faculty
Writers from Cincinnati
Novelists from Ohio